Lieutenant General Epaphras Denga Ndaitwah (born 13 December 1952) is a Namibian diplomat and military commander. He was the chief of the Namibia Defence Force (NDF) from 24 January 2011 to 31 December 2013.

Born in Ohangwena Region, Ndaitwah joined SWAPO's military wing, the People's Liberation Army of Namibia (PLAN), in 1974 and participated in Namibia's struggle for independence in various positions. He attended military training in Russia, Yugoslavia, India, Nigeria, Zambia and Tanzania.

NDF career
At Namibia's independence in 1990, Ndaitwah became the first military assistant to the Chief of the Defence Force, Dimo Hamaambo. He held the rank of Lieutenant Colonel at that time. He became Deputy Commander of the Army in 1997. Until 2006 Ndaitwah served as Chargé d’affaires of Namibia to the Democratic Republic of Congo. He was promoted to Major General in 2008 and appointed as Chief of Operations, Plans and Training, and to Lieutenant General in 2011 at the occasion of his appointment as Chief of the Namibian Defence Force, succeeding Martin Shalli. He served in that position until the end of 2013 when John Mutwa was appointed new Chief of the NDF.

In 2007, Ndaitwah graduated with a master's degree in Strategic Studies from University of Ibadan, Nigeria. He is  a student of Public Management at the Polytechnic of Namibia.

He is married to Netumbo Nandi-Ndaitwah, Namibia's Deputy Prime Minister and Minister of International Relations and Cooperation.

Medals and awards
  Campaign Medal
  NDF Commendation Medal
  UNAVEM Medal

References

1952 births
Living people
People from Ohangwena Region
People's Liberation Army of Namibia personnel
Members of SWAPO
Namibian diplomats
Namibian military personnel
University of Ibadan alumni
Ambassadors of Namibia to the Democratic Republic of the Congo